Michail Fragoulakis (born 15 July 1983) is a Greek professional footballer who plays for the Greek Gamma Ethniki club Giouchtas.

Career
Born in Heraklion, Fragoulakis began his football career with the youth teams of OFI. He made his professional debut for local side Atsalenios however, on loan from OFI, spending 1,5 year in the Gamma Ethniki before being released from his contract after refusing a second loan spell deal with Kallithea. He then joined newly promoted local rival Ergotelis in 2006, seizing his opportunity to play in the Greek Superleague. Within a span of six years, Fragoulakis featured in 133 official matches, scoring 11 goals for the club. At the end of the 2011–12 season he terminated his contract with the relegated Ergotelis to join fellow Superleague side Asteras Tripoli and feature in the UEFA Europa League 2nd and 3rd qualifying rounds. At the end of the season, he was released by Asteras Tripoli and went on to rejoin his first club OFI, also a contender in the Greek Superleague. His second spell at OFI however was abruptly terminated after a dispute with manager Gennaro Gattuso, who allegedly requested Fragoulakis and teammate Iosif Daskalakis to be expelled from the club. Following this dispute, Fragoulakis' contract was terminated and he went on to sign for Football League 2 side Kissamikos for six months, helping them achieve promotion to the Football League.

On 13 July 2015, Fragoulakis returned to OFI on a season-long deal, after the club declared bankruptcy and was willingly relegated to the amateur Gamma Ethniki division, the third tier of the Greek football league system. Despite Fragoulakis being a regular starter throughout the season (28 caps, 3 goals), which saw the club win the division title and achieve promotion to the Football League, his contract with the club was not renewed for the club's fresh start in professional competitions. Fragoulakis eventually signed with local club Irodotos, playing in the Heraklion FCA regional championship. He became an instrumental component in Irodotos' return to professional divisions, during which he celebrated 6 amateur titles within a span of two seasons.

Honours

Club
 OFI
 Gamma Ethniki (1): 2015–16

 Irodotos
 Heraklion FCA A1 Championship (1): 2016−17
 Heraklion FCA Cup (1): 2016−17
 Greek Football Amateur Cup (1): 2016−17
 Amateurs' Super Cup Greece (1): 2016–17
 Heraklion FCA Super Cup (1): 2017
 Gamma Ethniki (1): 2017–18

References

External links
Guardian Football
Profile at Onsports.gr

1983 births
Living people
OFI Crete F.C. players
Ergotelis F.C. players
Asteras Tripolis F.C. players
Irodotos FC players
Association football midfielders
Footballers from Heraklion
Greek footballers